Judge is an occupational surname of British origin. The first recorded instance of the surname is in 1309 in the Middle, English Occupation Register,  Worcester, England.

Notable people with the surname include:

In arts and entertainment
Arline Judge (1912–1974), American actress 
Christopher Judge (born 1964), American actor
David Judge (actor) (born 1983), British actor
Frank Judge (born 1940s), American poet, publisher, translator, journalist, film critic, teacher, and arts administrator
Gurbani Judge (born 1987), Indian Actress and Model better known as VJ Bani
Jack Judge (1872–1938), British songwriter
Jonathan Judge, American television director and producer
Malcolm Judge (1918–1989), British cartoonist
Mark Judge (writer) (born 1964), American author and journalist
Maureen Judge (born 1955), Canadian filmmaker
Mike Judge (born 1962), American actor, animator, writer, producer, director and musician
Simran Judge, Indian-American actor

In government and politics
Carl Judge, Australian politician
David Judge (born 1950), British political scientist
Francis G. Judge (1908-1994}, American politician
Igor Judge (born 1941), British judge
John Judge (politician) (born 1944), American politician
Patty Judge (born 1943), American politician
Thomas Lee Judge (1934–2006), American politician
Virginia Judge (born 1956), Australian former politician

In religion
Mychal Judge (1933–2001), American Catholic priest
William Judge (1850–1899), American Jesuit priest
William Quan Judge (1851–1896), Irish-American mystic, esotericist, occultist, Theosophist

In sport
Aaron Judge (born 1992), American baseball player
Alan Judge (English footballer) (born 1960)
Alan Judge (Irish footballer) (born 1988)
Betty Judge (1921–2015), Australian athlete
David Judge (field hockey) (1936–2015), Irish field hockey player and coach, represented Great Britain at the 1964 Olympics
Joe Judge (baseball) (1894–1963), American baseball player
Joe Judge (American football) (born 1981), American football coach
Joe Judge (footballer) (born 1947), Scottish footballer
Ken Judge (1958–2016), Australian football player and coach
Matthew Judge (born 1985), English footballer
Michael Judge (born 1975), Irish snooker player
Peter Judge (cricketer) (1916–1992), British cricketer
Samantha Judge (born 1978), British hockey player
Tim Judge (born 1964), American former professional bicycle motocross racer

In other fields
Anthony Judge (born 1940), Australian knowledge management researcher
Barbara Judge (1946–2020), American-British lawyer and businesswoman
Bernard M. Judge (1940–2019), American journalist
Darrell Lynn Judge (1934–2014), American physicist
Joan Judge, British history professor
Mark Judge (architect), British architect
Oney Judge (1773–1848), American slave of George Washington's family
Paul Judge (1949–2017), British businessman and government advisor, endowed Cambridge Judge Business School

See also
Judge (disambiguation)

References

Occupational surnames
Surnames of British Isles origin
English-language occupational surnames